Balatonendréd is a village in Somogy County, Hungary. The settlement is a holiday resort near to Lake Balaton known for its wine and for its bobbin lace. The most famous sight is the Kájel Lace Museum.

The settlement is part of the Balatonboglár wine region.

Gallery

External links 
 Street map (Hungarian)

References 

Populated places in Somogy County